Pernell may refer to:

Given name:
Pernell Davis (born 1976), American football defensive tackle
Pernell McPhee (born 1988), American football linebacker
Pernell Roberts (1928–2010), American stage, movie and television actor
Pernell Saturnino, Grammy Award winner percussionist from Curaçao
Pernell Whitaker (1964–2019), American professional boxing trainer
Pernell (healer) (floruit 1350), English healer

Surname:
Geoffrey Pernell, murderer of Louise Jensen in 1994 in Cyprus
Lia Pernell (born 1981), American rower
Ruby Pernell (1917–2001), professor of social work at the University of Minnesota

Places:
Pernell, Oklahoma, unincorporated community in Garvin County, Oklahoma, United States